Susan Rennie Stephen (16 July 1931 – 21 April 2000) was an English film actress.

Born in London, she was known in the 1950s for appearing in a number of B-films. She appeared in over 20 films including The Red Beret (1953), The House Across the Lake (1954), Pacific Destiny (1956) and Carry On Nurse (1959).

Although she joined other celebrities, such as Jack Payne, in British Pathé's Return to Yesterday in 1955, her film appearances became less frequent following her second marriage to film director Nicolas Roeg from 1957 to 1977.

Filmography

 His Excellency (1952) - Peggy Harrison
 Stolen Face (1952) - Betty
 Treasure Hunt (1952) - Mary O'Leary
 Father's Doing Fine (1952) - Bicky
 Finishing School (1953) - Lorna Whitmore
 The Red Beret (1953) - Penny Gardner
 Stryker of the Yard (1953) - Peggy Sinclair
 Golden Ivory (1954) - Ruth Meecham
 The House Across the Lake (1954) - Andrea Forrest
 Dangerous Cargo (1954) - Janie Matthews
 For Better, for Worse (1954) - Anne Purves
 As Long as They're Happy (1955) - Corinne Bentley
 Value for Money (1955) - Ethel
 It's Never Too Late (1956) - Tessa Hammond
 Pacific Destiny (1956) - Olivia Grimble
 The Barretts of Wimpole Street (1957) - Bella Hedley
 Carry On Nurse (1959) - Nurse Georgie Axwell
 Operation Stogie (1959)
 Return of a Stranger (1961) - Pam Reed
 The Court Martial of Major Keller (1961) - Laura Winch
 Three Spare Wives (1962) - Susan

External links
 

1931 births
2000 deaths
English film actresses
20th-century English actresses